Iva annua, the annual marsh elder or sumpweed, is a North American herbaceous annual plant in the family Asteraceae that was historically cultivated by Native Americans for its edible seed.

Description
Iva annua is an annual herb up to 150 cm (5 feet) tall. The plant produces many small flower heads in a narrow, elongated, spike-like array, each head with 11–17 disc florets but no ray florets.

Distribution
It is native to northeastern Mexico (Tamaulipas) and to the central and southern United States, primarily the Great Plains and Mississippi Valley as far north as North Dakota. There are some populations in the eastern US, but these appear to represent introductions.

Uses
Iva annua was cultivated for its edible seed by Native Americans around 4,000 years ago in the central and eastern United States as part of the Eastern Agricultural Complex. It was especially important to the indigenous peoples of the Kansas City Hopewell culture in present-day Missouri and Illinois. The edible parts contain 32 percent protein and 45 percent oil.

However, like its relative ragweed, sumpweed possesses many objectionable qualities which include being a severe potential allergen and possessing a disagreeable odor. Probably for these reasons it was abandoned after more pleasant alternatives (such as maize) were available and, by the time Europeans arrived in the Americas, had long disappeared as a crop.

See also
 New World crops

References

External links

 Plants Profile for Iva annua (annual marsh elder) 
  Germplasm Resources Information Network−GRIN: treatment of Iva annua
  Includes photographs.
 Photo of herbarium specimen at Missouri Botanical Garden

annua
Pseudocereals
Flora of the Great Plains (North America)
Flora of the United States
Flora of the South-Central United States
Flora of the Southeastern United States
Flora of the Great Lakes region (North America)
Flora of the Appalachian Mountains
Flora of Tamaulipas
Flora of Veracruz
Edible nuts and seeds
Crops originating from Pre-Columbian North America
Native American cuisine of the Southeastern Woodlands
Pre-Columbian Great Plains cuisine
Crops originating from the United States
Plants described in 1753
Taxa named by Carl Linnaeus
Flora without expected TNC conservation status